Julia Jäkel (born November 13, 1971, in Mainz) is a German business executive and publisher. She serves as non-executive director of several companies. From 2012 to 2021, Jäkel was Chief Executive Officer of Gruner + Jahr and a member of the Bertelsmann Group Management Committee. She also chaired the Bertelsmann Content Alliance. Jäkel is a widely known promoter of diverse leadership.

Education 
Jäkel studied history, political science, and economics at Heidelberg University and Harvard University. She holds an MPhil in International relations from the University of Cambridge.

Career 
In 1997, Jäkel completed the Bertelsmann Entrepreneurs Program and joined Gruner + Jahr, where she rose through the ranks. In 2012, Jäkel was appointed to the Executive Board, taking responsibility for the German business, and a few months later, she became chief executive officer of Gruner + Jahr. At the beginning of her term, she discontinued the Financial Times Deutschland of which she had been a member of the founding team for five years. She reorganized the portfolio, focusing on Germany and France. Jäkel led the digital transformation, promoted creativity and multiplied digital revenues. She broke up hierarchies and outdated management structures, and made the publisher more efficient.

Jäkel became a member of the Bertelsmann Group Management Committee in 2013 and chaired the Bertelsmann Content Alliance right from its start in 2019, coordinating all content businesses of Bertelsmann in Germany. In 2021, Jäkel left both Gruner + Jahr and Bertelsmann at her own request.

She received awards for her entrepreneurial and journalistic engagement. Since January 2022, she has been a member of the European Advisory Board of Google Cloud.

Other boards 
 since 2015: University Medical Center Hamburg-Eppendorf
 since 2018: Elbphilharmonie Hamburg
 since 2019: DFL Foundation (German Football League Foundation)
 since 2021: Deutsche Presse-Agentur (German Press Agency)

References

External links 
 

1971 births
Living people
German business executives
German chief executives
Alumni of the University of Cambridge
21st-century German businesspeople
21st-century German women